Semberija is a geographical region in north-eastern Bosnia and Herzegovina. The main city in the region is Bijeljina. Semberija is located between the Drina and Sava rivers and Majevica mountain. Most of the region is administratively situated in the entity of Republika Srpska, and the smaller part in the entity of Federation of Bosnia and Herzegovina.
Semberija has a very rich history. It was first mentioned in 1533 during the Ottoman rule. The name Semberija is of Hungarian origin and probably related to the time of the 12th-16th centuries when this area was occasionally held by the Hungarian Kingdom. Today about 200,000 people live in the area of Semberija, most in the municipality of Bijeljina.

Municipalities
Municipalities in the region of Semberija:
Bijeljina 107,715 inhabitants
Čelić 12,083 inhabitants
Lopare 15,357 inhabitants
Ugljevik 15,710 inhabitants

Gallery

References

External links
SKUD Semberija Bijeljina
Semberija folk fest: Ritam Evrope

Fields of Bosnia and Herzegovina
Regions of Bosnia and Herzegovina
Semberija